Bernstein/Beethoven is the name of a 1982 Leonard Bernstein miniseries telecast between 1982 and 1983 on both PBS and A&E. As with most post-1969 Bernstein programs, it was directed by Humphrey Burton, who was, according to Schuyler Chapin, Bernstein's director of choice. It was nominated for an Emmy and won a Cable ACE Award. It was filmed largely on location in Vienna and Germany, and not only featured Bernstein but also actor Maximilian Schell, who not only provided commentary on Beethoven, but read from his letters.

The miniseries contains performances of all of Beethoven's symphonies as well as several overtures, a string quartet that Bernstein re-orchestrated for the entire string section of the Vienna Philharmonic, and the Missa Solemnis, all conducted by Bernstein. It also contains commentary about the music by Leonard Bernstein.

The entire miniseries has recently been issued on DVD.

References

1980s American television miniseries
Ludwig van Beethoven
Leonard Bernstein